Elhem Mekhaled (born 7 February 1991) is a French professional boxer. She has held the European female super-featherweight title since 2018 and also held the WBC interim female super-featherweight title in 2019.

Professional career
Mekhaled made her professional debut on 12 November 2016, scoring a four-round points decision (PTS) victory against Jacinthe Berenguer at the Palais des Sports René-Bougnol in Montpellier, France.

She began 2017 with two PTS victories—Valentina Keri in January and Bilitis Gaucher in February—before defeating Wendy Vincent via fourth-round technical knockout (TKO) for the vacant French female super-featherweight title on 17 March at the Salle La Cotonne in Saint-Étienne, France.

After six more wins, including two defences of her French title, Mekhaled defeated Marina Sakharov via ninth-round TKO, capturing the vacant European female super-featherweight title on 22 December 2018 at the Palais des Sports Jean Capievic in her home town of Vaulx-en-Velin.

In her next fight she faced Danila Ramos for the vacant WBC interim female super-featherweight title on 16 March 2019 at the W Hotel in Barcelona, Spain. Mekhaled captured her first world title, albeit an interim version, via ten-round unanimous decision (UD). Two judges scored the bout 97–93 and the third scored it 96–94.

On 8 September 2020, it was announced that Mekhaled had signed a managerial contract with MTK Global.

Professional boxing record

References

External links

Living people
1991 births
French women boxers
Sportspeople from Rhône (department)
Super-featherweight boxers
European Boxing Union champions
African Games medalists in boxing
Algerian women boxers
African Games bronze medalists for Algeria
Competitors at the 2015 African Games
20th-century French women
21st-century French women